Carpenter–Haygood Stadium is an American football stadium in Arkadelphia, Arkansas that serves as the home field for the Henderson State Reddies.

The stadium opened in 1968 and was named in honor of Jimmy R. Haygood who was Henderson State's head football coach from 1907 to 1924. "Carpenter" was added to the stadium name in 1990 to honor former coach Ralph Carpenter, who died on February 16, 1990, after serving as head coach for 19 years.

A GeoGreen surface was installed in 2011.

References

External links
 Henderson State Athletics: Carpenter-Haygood Stadium at Ruggles Field

College football venues
American football venues in Arkansas
Henderson State Reddies football
1968 establishments in Arkansas
Sports venues completed in 1968